Jazz royalty is a term encompassing the many jazz musicians who have been termed as exceptionally musically gifted and informally granted honorific, "aristocratic" or "royal" titles as nicknames. The practice of affixing honorific titles to the names of jazz musicians goes back to New Orleans at the start of the 20th century, before the genre was commonly known as "jazz".

History
In New York City in the 1920s, Paul Whiteman was billed as the "King of Jazz". His popular band with many hit records arguably played more jazz-influenced popular music than jazz per se, but to the dismay of many later jazz fans, Whiteman's self-conferred moniker stuck, and a film  The King of Jazz starring Whiteman and his band appeared in 1930. The "King of Jazz" title was a publicity stunt in 1923 by an instrument manufacturer that Whiteman endorsed.

Titles

King
 King Bolden: Buddy Bolden
 The King of Swing: Benny Goodman
 King Oliver
 Nat King Cole

Queen
 The Queen of Jazz: Ella Fitzgerald
 The Empress of the Blues: Bessie Smith
 Malaysia's Queen of Jazz: Sheila Majid
 The Queen of Filipino Jazz: Katy de la Cruz

Other royal titles
 The Prince of Darkness: Miles Davis
 The Maharaja: Oscar Peterson
 The Duke: Duke Ellington
 The Prince of Cool: Chet Baker

Non-royal nobility
 Count: William James "Count" Basie

See also

The related tradition of Calypsonian nicknames
List of honorific titles in popular music
List of nicknames of jazz musicians

References

Royalty
Nicknames
Royalty
Blues